Grambling Stadium was a stadium in Grambling, Louisiana, United States. It hosted the Grambling State University Tigers football team until the school moved to Eddie Robinson Stadium in 1983. The stadium held 18,000 people at its peak.

See also
 Eddie Robinson Stadium

References

External links
 Venue information

Defunct college football venues
Demolished sports venues in Louisiana
Grambling State Tigers football
Sports venues in Grambling, Louisiana
Sports venues in Louisiana